Margot Anand (born 27 July 1944) is a French author, teacher, seminar leader and public speaker. She has written numerous books including The Art of Sexual Ecstasy; The Art of Everyday Ecstasy; and The Art of Sexual Magic. Her mother was Protestant, and her father was Russian Orthodox and she was raised in Orthodox religion.

Margot (or "Margo") Anand (Sanskrit "Ananda"=Bliss) received her degree from the Sorbonne in Paris. She began her writing career as a journalist covering the American pop culture scene for French magazines, after which she retreated from public life for an extended period to study tantra and related disciplines. Osho Rajneesh was her tantra teacher when she learned it in India in the late 1970s. She began to teach tantra at Osho's ashram in Pune and subsequently became notable as one of the first teachers to introduce tantra and Neotantra to a broad public in Europe and the United States. She designed a practice called "SkyDancing Tantra" that is promoted as a tantric practice. 

Anand taught as adjunct faculty with Deepak Chopra at his seminars and conferences for several years and has taught at Dean Ornish's annual retreats for heart patients.

Bibliography

Books
 The Art of Sexual Magic (9 September 1996) Tarcher , 
 The Art of Everyday Ecstasy: The Seven Tantric Keys for Bringing Passion, Spirit and Joy into Every Part of Your Life (15 June 1998) Broadway , 
 The Kama Sutra of Vatsyayana (Modern Library Classics) (Introduction by Margot Anand, Translation by Richard Francis Burton) (14 May 2002) Modern Library , 
 Sexual Ecstasy: The Art of Orgasm (18 May 2000) Tarcher , 
 The Sexual Ecstasy Workbook (3 February 2005) Tarcher ,

DVDs, videos, and audio 
 Margot Anand's Secret Keys to the Ultimate Love Life (3 DVD set)
 The Art of Orgasm – The Multi-Orgasmic Couple (for Men & Women)
 Everyday Ecstasy: Music for Passion, Spirit (music CD)
 Sexual Magic Meditations: Cultivating Sexual Energy to Transform Your Life (audio cassette) (September 1996) Sounds True , 
 SkyDancing Tantra: A Call to Bliss (music CD)

References

External links
Official website

1944 births
University of Paris alumni
Living people
French non-fiction writers
French Christians
Neotantra
French sexologists
Rajneesh movement